Grand United Order of True Reformers was an American fraternal organization for African-Americans led by people of European-descent, founded in 1873 in Alabama and Kentucky. By , the Grand Fountain of the United Order of True Reformers, or the True Reformers, was re-organized for and led by African-Americans and founded in Richmond, Virginia by William Washington Browne. This organization existed as a business and a mutual-aid society during the era of Jim Crow segregation laws, and it supported the growing African-American middle class through economic opportunities and education, before its closure in 1934.

History

Grand United Order of True Reformers (1873–1880s) 
The Grand United Order of True Reformers began in the 1873 in Alabama and Kentucky. It existed as an African American organization led by the all-White organization of the Independent Order of Good Templars. The organization was active in the temperance movement, and provided their members with sick and death benefits. 

William "Ben" Washington Browne was born in 1849 as a Black man into bondage on the Georgia plantation owned by Benjamin Pryor in Habersham County. He eventually escaped his enslavers during the American Civil War and joined the Union Army, followed by a discharge of service in 1862. Browne attended school in Wisconsin, followed by a period of teaching and church ministry in the south. He was an outspoken proponent of the temperance movement, and eventually he joined the Grand United Order of True Reformers. Around 1875, Browne was invited by the True Reformers to spearhead a new branch of the movement in Richmond, Virginia.

Grand Fountain of the United Order of True Reformers (1875–1934) 
Browne created the organization with the purpose of reviving the Grand United Order of True Reformers, which had become less active. 

When interest in the organization began to decrease Browne began shifting the organization from a temperance society to an insurance organization, a movement that required Browne to move to the city of Richmond in 1880. The Grand Fountain of the United Order of True Reformers expanded in order to support a growing African American middle class and offered business services included a bank, a real estate company, it owned several properties, it ran a newspaper entitled the Reformer, it owned a retirement home, and had a children’s division. At one point in time was the largest black fraternal society and black-owned business in the United States. It reached the 70,000 members by 1900, and by that time had also contributed US $2 million in benefits and relief.

The True Reformers Savings Bank 
In 1889, The True Reformers Savings Bank opened, it was the first Black bank in the United States to receive a bank charter. Giles Beecher Jackson of Richmond, Virginia had helped found the bank affiliated with the True Reformers organization. At the banks peak in 1907, it took in deposits of more than US $1 million. However by 1910, the bank closed after an embezzlement scandal and a number of large loan defaults occurred. The organization existed until 1934, however it was mostly collapsed after the closure of the bank. After the bank defaulted, the organization was not able to payout the outstanding insurance claims which caused the state of Virginia to revoked their insurance license.

Notable people 

 Mary E. Cary Burrell, educator and businessperson
 William Patrick Burrell, secretary to Browne for the Grand Fountain of the United Order of True Reformers
 William Nauns Ricks, poet

See also 
 List of Temperance organizations

References

Further reading

External links 
 
 Archive image: Grand Fountain, United Order of True Reformers (U.O.T.R.) officers and employees from the Virginia Historical Society
 Archive: United Order of True Reformers, Fountain #2817 Minute Book, 1888; 1907-1910 from Wilson Library, University of North Carolina at Chapel Hill

Temperance organizations in the United States
African Americans' rights organizations
Business organizations based in the United States
African-American professional organizations
Organizations established in 1873
Mutual savings banks in the United States
Mutual insurance companies of the United States